

Denmark
Danish West Indies -

Portugal
 Angola – José Maria da Ponte e Horta, Governor-General of Angola (1870–1873)

United Kingdom
Ceylon – Sir Hercules Robinson (until January), then William Henry Gregory (from March)
Hong Kong – Sir Richard Graves MacDonnell (until April), then Sir Arthur Edward Kennedy
 Jamaica – Sir John Peter Grant, Governor of Jamaica (1866–1874)
Malta Colony
Patrick Grant, Governor of Malta (1867–1872)
Charles van Straubenzee, Governor of Malta (1872–1878)
New South Wales
 Somerset Lowry-Corry, Lord Belmore, Governor of New South Wales (1868–1872)
 Hercules Robinson, Lord Rosmead, Governor of New South Wales (1872–1879)
 Queensland – George Phipps, Lord Normanby, Governor of Queensland (1871–1874)
 Tasmania – Sir Charles Du Cane, Governor of Tasmania (1869–1874)
 South Australia – Sir James Fergusson, Bt, Governor of South Australia (1869–1873)
 Victoria – John Manners-Sutton, Lord Canterbury, Governor of Victoria (1866–1873)
 Western Australia – Major Frederick Weld, Governor of Western Australia (1869–1875)

Colonial governors
Colonial governors
1872